Cladius may refer to:
 Cladius (sawfly), a genus of sawflies in the family Tenthredinidae 
 Cladius Detlev Fritzsch (1765–1841),  Danish painter
 Cladius Labib (1868–1918), Egyptian Egyptologist

See also
 Claudius (disambiguation)